Samuel Turner may refer to:

 Samuel Turner (Royalist) (died c. 1647), physician and Royalist during the English Civil War
 Samuel Turner (diplomat) (1759-1802), British traveller
 Samuel Turner (informer) (1765–1807), Irish barrister, Protestant supporter of the United Irishmen who turned informer
 Samuel H. Turner (1790–1861), American Hebraist
 Samuel Turner (VC) (1826–1868), English soldier decorated for valour during the Indian Mutiny
 Sam Turner (footballer, born 1980), Welsh former footballer
 Sam Turner (footballer, born 1993), English footballer